Leonel Antonio Fernández Reyna (born 26 December 1953) is a Dominican lawyer, academic, and was the 50th and 52nd President of the Dominican Republic from 1996 to 2000 and from 2004 to 2012. From 2016 until 2020, he was the President of the EU–LAC Foundation.

Fernández became the first elected president of the Dominican Republic under his political party, the Dominican Liberation Party (Partido de la Liberación Dominicana, or PLD), although party founder Juan Bosch was also sworn in as president in 1963 after the first democratic elections held in roughly four decades in the country. Fernández's administrations have focused much on technological and infrastructural development and macroeconomic and monetary stability. He has served as the party president of the Dominican Liberation Party from 2001 until his resignation on 20 October 2019. He later joined the People’s Force and was nominated as it’s party’s presidential nominee.

He is a native of Villa Juana, Distrito Nacional and lived for much of his childhood and early adulthood in New York City.

Leonel Fernández is the President of the World Federation of United Nations Associations and a member of the Inter-American Dialogue.

Early life
Fernandez is the son of sergeant major José Antonio Fernández Collado and Yolanda Reyna Romero. His family moved to New York City in the United States. They lived most of the time in the Washington Heights neighborhood, a dense Manhattan neighborhood dominated by Dominicans.

After he finished high school, Fernandez returned to his country and started law studies in the Universidad Autonoma de Santo Domingo. He joined the Dominican Liberation Party when it was founded in 1973 by former Dominican President Juan Bosch, leaving the Dominican Revolutionary Party (PRD) to do so. Fernández was known as a close pupil of Bosch. He accompanied him as a vice-presidential candidate in the 1994 presidential election.

First presidential term (1996–2000)

The 1994 presidential election results, which resulted in a reelection of President Joaquín Balaguer, were widely opposed by runner-up opposition leader José Francisco Peña Gómez and his party. In the meantime, the international community rose their concerns on the tightening of the political tensions and fear the country was on the verge of a civil uprising. Upon an official agreement widely known as "Pact for Democracy" ("Pacto por la Democracia" in Spanish) a special election was scheduled for May 1996 and President Balaguer acceded to not run in this election as part of the arranged treaty. PRSC opted to present Vice-President Jacinto Peynado as their candidate, however PRSC supporters feared he wasn't properly endorsed by their historical leader, therefore creating a vast independent mass of electors.

In the first-round election on 16 May 1996 Fernández received 38.9% of the votes in the first round achieving second place behind José Francisco Peña Gómez and PRD. Peynado obtained 15% of the votes, the lowest outcome in Balaguer's party history which initiated a long-term downfall. After 2010 Presidential election, PRSC lost briefly its official recognition as a majority party, but regained it after an alliance with PLD was announced by Leonel Fernández for 2010 mid-term elections, in where both parties achieved 100% of Senate positions and obtained over 2/3 of the seats on the Chamber of Deputies. In the run-off election, held on 30 June 1996, the "Patriotic Front" integrated, and Fernández thus secured 51.2% of the votes to win the election. He was sworn in as President on 16 August 1996, succeeding Balaguer.

During his term in office, Fernández's political agenda was one of economic and critical reform. He helped enhance Dominican participation in hemispheric forums, such as the Organization of American States and the Summit of the Americas. The Dominican economy enjoyed an average growth rate of seven percent, the highest in Latin America for that period, and was among the highest in the world along with South Korea's and the People's Republic of China's. Inflation was stabilized in the low single digits, also among the lowest of Latin America.

Fernández also began a visionary plan to run the Dominican Republic. When developers proposed the country's first modern port during his first term, he said that "We could be the Singapore of the Caribbean". In Santo Domingo and Santiago, which comprised 40% of the country's population, he favored "mega-projects", building numerous highways and tunnels which improved transit across the greater extent of these cities and created OMSA (Metropolitan Office of Autobus Services in English). His administration also gave incentives for foreign direct investment.

In 2000, Fernández was unable to run for a consecutive term as the 1994 constitution prohibited it. His party held primaries to elect a presidential nominee, which were won by Danilo Medina with 52% of the votes against Vice-President Jaime David Fernández Mirabal. Medina, who was sworn as the PLD candidate for the 2000 presidential election, was defeated by the PRD candidate, Hipólito Mejía. Mejia did not satisfy the 50% rule to avoid a feared run-off election, but Medina, who placed second, recognized Mejia's win immediately.

Second presidential term (2004–2008)

Fernández was elected to a second term of office in the presidential election held on 16 May 2004 with an absolute majority and the second highest percentage ever in Dominican history of 57%. He was sworn in on 16 August 2004. His victory was due in large part to the collapse of the Dominican economy. This collapse has been attributed to skyrocketing oil prices and a slumping international economy post-9/11, excessive borrowing under the Mejía administration and the failure of three banks in the country: Banco Intercontinental (Baninter), Bancrédito and Banco Mercantil. In an effort to avoid further economic chaos, the Mejía administration effectively underwrote all three banks, repaying their customers but generating even greater public debt. Some of the bankers involved have been or are on trial, yet the extent of their fraud is hard to measure as their widespread largess with officials within both the Fernández and Mejía administrations has made it nearly impossible to achieve a true accounting of what conditions led to the bank's demise.

According to local sociologist José Oviedo, "The country trusts him with the economy, but he doesn't seem to pay that much attention to social issues." The economic prosperity which his government prided itself on seemed to fail in reaching enough people. According to The Wall Street Journal, the economy situation worsened during his last term.

The presidents of Ecuador, Colombia and Venezuela shook hands during the Rio Group summit, and agreed to end the dispute caused by a Colombian raid against FARC on Ecuadorian territory, for a special request from summit host
Dominican Republic President Leonel Fernandez at 7 March 2008. Such Honored act let Fernández received World Peace Culture Award on 6 April 2008.

Third presidential term (2008–2012)

During the Mejía administration, the constitution was changed to again allow the immediate re-election of presidents. Although Mejía was ultimately unsuccessful in his bid for re-election, this opened the door for Fernández to attempt a similar run. On 7 May 2007, despite great controversy over whether the PLD party should support the concept of re-election, Fernández won the PLD primary election with a 72% voting percentage against his former Chief of Staff and confidant, Danilo Medina.

As a result, Fernández became the official PLD candidate for the presidency in the May 2008 General Election.

Fernández was declared the victor of the 2008 election, defeating six others, including the PRD candidate and former president Mejía's right-hand man, Miguel Vargas, and the PRSC's candidate, Amable Aristy. Fernández defeated Vargas 53% to 41%. Vargas accepted the defeat the same day, 16 May. Fernández was sworn in for his third term on 16 August 2008, with the traditional ceremony at the National Congress. An ongoing international economic crisis which occurred during this time did not prevent the Dominican Republic from remaining the fastest growing economy in Latin America, with a growth rate of 3.5 percent in 2009 and a projected growth rate of 6.5 to 7 percent in 2010.

Civil society engagement 
In 2000, Leonel Fernandez founded the Fundación Global Democracia y Desarrollo (FUNGLODE), headquartered in Santo Domingo, as a think tank as well as a resource and training centre. In 2002, he founded a sister organisation, the Global Foundation for Democracy and Development, dedicated to promoting collaboration between organizations in the United States and the Dominican Republic.

On 20 October 2018, the 42nd Plenary Assembly of the World Federation of United Nations Associations (WFUNA) unanimously elected him president of the global body for a 3-year renewable term thus succeeding to South Korea's senior Ambassador Park Soo-gil and former International Atomic Energy Agency Director General, Hans Blix.

Family and personal life
Fernández married for the first time to Rocío Domínguez Quezada in 1987 (the daughter of Juan Domínguez and the mayoress of Jarabacoa Josefa Piedad Quezada), and had two children, Omar and Nicole. They divorced in 1996. In 2003, Fernández married Margarita Cedeño Lizardo, his former Presidential Legal Adviser and an associate attorney of his law firm, having another child, Yolanda América María. The couple divorced in 2022.

As of Fall 2022, Fernández' daughter, Nicole, was dating baseball superstar Albert Pujols.

In addition to Spanish, his mother tongue, Fernández is fluent in English and French.

Leonel Antonio Fernandez graduated with honours in law from the Autonomous University of Santo Domingo. For a while he worked as a teacher and a journalist before getting into politics. His interest in politics derived from his outstanding student leader abilities, and his dominant role in the General Secretariat of the Students' Association University of Santo Domingo. Moreover, Leonel Antonio Fernandez partook in many protests against the Balaguer regime, was a member of the Central and Political Committees of the Party of Dominican Liberation, which was founded by Juan Bosch. He began expanding his political interests and won Presidency in the Dominican Republic in 1996.

See also

 Politics of the Dominican Republic

References

External links
Biography
Biography at CIDOB Foundation 

|-

1953 births
Collars of the Order of Christopher Columbus
Dominican Liberation Party politicians
20th-century Dominican Republic lawyers
Living people
Order of Merit of Duarte, Sánchez and Mella
People from Santo Domingo
Presidents of political parties in the Dominican Republic
Presidents of the Dominican Republic
Dominican Republic people of Spanish descent
World Federation of United Nations Associations
Members of the Inter-American Dialogue